Student housing at Florida State University is governed by the Office of University Housing, and provides housing for undergraduates, graduate students, and professional students on and off-campus. Overall about 85% of first time in college students live in residence halls. In addition over 20% of all undergraduates live in student housing.

Facilities at Florida State include 17 residence halls on campus.  About 6,200 undergraduates live in a majority of the residence halls. Nontraditional Student and Family Housing consists of Rogers Hall, an apartment facility with 94 one bedroom units reserved for single graduate students and older single undergraduate students, a single or double-occupancy apartment; and Ragans Hall an apartment facility with space for graduate students designated in building 4.  Ragans Hall also houses undergraduate students above the freshman level in three-and four-bedroom apartments, with a total capacity of 555 students. In addition McCollum Hall, an apartment facility with 40 single-occupancy efficiencies and 40 townhouses is also available. The university previously had Alumni Village, which had housing for families and single graduate students and older undergraduate students.

Undergraduate-only housing

East Campus Area

West Campus Area

Undergraduate and graduate housing

Ragans Hall

Sherrill W. Ragans Hall is in the West Campus area of the main FSU campus property. It may house up to 555 men and women. Each apartment at Ragans has room for three to four students, which each student having his or her own bedroom. Each apartment has two bathrooms and a cooking unit. Ragans students are not required to purchase meal membership plans. Undergraduate students above the first year (freshman) level and returning undergraduate residence hall students may live in Ragans. However, freshman students were allowed to live in Ragans during the 2016-2017 calendar year to make up for the 562 beds lost due to the pending closure of Smith before the completion of the Phase II University Housing Replacement Project. Most Ragans residents are undergraduates. In addition, single graduate students are eligible to live in Ragans. A limited number of rooms are reserved for graduate students.

Traditions Hall

Traditions Hall is located in the West Campus Area of the main FSU campus property. This apartment building opened in 2012. This building houses up to 276 men and woman. Each apartment unit at Traditions Hall houses two students each.  Each unit consists of two bedrooms, a kitchen, common area and a bathroom. Traditions Hall residents are not required to have meal plans. Undergraduate students above the first year (freshman) level and returning undergraduate residence hall students may live in Traditions. Most Traditions residents are undergraduates. In addition, single graduate students are eligible to live in Traditions. Like Regans, a limited number of rooms are reserved for graduate students.

Former housing

Former undergraduate housing
 Deviney Hall (former building, closed in Fall 2015)
 Capacity: 243
 Status: Male/Female
 Community style
 Dorman Hall (former building, closed in Fall 2015)
 Capacity: 281
 Status: Male/Female
 Community style
 Kellum Hall (former building, closed in Fall 2015)  
 Capacity: 538
 Status: Male/Female
 Community Style

Kellum, a 10-story brick building, was erected in the 1950s as many male students entered FSU in the post-World War II period. Sandy D’Alemberte, a president of FSU, called the architecture of the building "Sputnik era" due to its functional design. It was named after John Gabriel Kellum, the business manager of the Florida State College for Women.

Kellum residents were moved out in spring 2015. Demolition commenced in 2016.

 Smith Hall (former building, closed in Fall 2016) 
 Capacity: 553
 Status: Male/Female
 Community style

Smith, a 10-story brick building, was erected in the 1950s as many male students entered FSU in the post-World War II period. Sandy D’Alemberte called the architecture of the building "Sputnik era" due to its functional design. It was named after a mathematics professor and assistant coach of the American football team, Elmer Smith. Demolition commenced in 2017.

Alumni Village

Alumni Village (AV) is a  Florida State University former housing property. One of the largest residential complexes in Tallahassee, Alumni Village had 1,100 resident student and family members as of 2011. The facility had 791 units, including flat units and townhouse units. Units included one, two, and three bedroom varieties. As of that year residents originate from 79 countries. An FSU Police Sub Station was located at Alumni Village. The streets were named after FSU graduates who died at young ages: Kenneth Daniel Bliss Jr., Kingman Mercer Brittain, Robert Edward Crenshaw, George Herlong, Coyle E. Moore Jr., and William Thomas Pennell. The streets are: Bliss Drive, Brittain Drive, Crenshaw Court, Crenshaw Drive, Herlong Drive, Coyle Moore Jr., Drive, Coyle Moore, Jr. Court, and Pennell Circle. At the time it was built, there was a relative high number of married students.

Alumni Village only admitted lease-payers who were degree-seeking, fee-paying students at Florida State, and the only people who were allowed to live with the lease-payers were immediate family members. Specifically, lease-paying students were allowed to be graduate students, undergraduate students of age 23 and older, married students, and students with children.

Alumni Village operated on the revenue collected through rent. StarMetro operated bus services to and from Alumni Village.

Two child care facilities, the FSU Children's Center and the Infant and Toddler Child Development Center, are located at Alumni Village. The Children's Center is a preschool for children aged 2 1/2 to 5, and may house up to 36 children. The Child Development Center is for children aged 6 weeks to 2 1/2 years, and may house up to 34 children.

Alumni Village, the designated housing unit for FSU students with children, was zoned to Leon County Schools. Residents were zoned to Pineview Elementary School, Nims Middle School, and Rickards High School. When Belle Vue Middle School existed, Alumni Village was zoned there. In 2007 the elementary school had high academic performance and was ranked as an "A" school by Florida educational authorities, but Belle Vue Middle and Rickards had lower performance levels and made "C" rankings.

For an eight-year period ending in 2011 Alumni Village's occupancy rate decreased, with the revenue declining 17% between 2003 and 2011. By 2014 there were relatively fewer married students, and newer housing properties had opened in the Tallahassee area.

It was announced that Florida State University will be closing Alumni Village on August 22, 2014, due to low occupancy levels, greater availability of on-campus housing, distance from campus and potential costs in renovating the property. The property stopped accepting new residents on May 12, 2014. By 2015 the property was completely demolished with the exception of the FSU Children's Center and the Infant and Toddler Center.

See also 

 Florida State University

External links 
 Official FSU Housing Website
 FSU Housing Statistics
 College Board Statistics

References 

University and college dormitories in the United States
Florida State University
Lists of university and college buildings in the United States